This is list of United States Lifesaving Stations in Michigan.

Beaver Island Harbor Light 
Big Sable Point Light
Bois Blanc Light 
Charlevoix Life Saving Station
Crisp Point Light
Deer Park Lifesaving Station 
Eagle Harbor Lifesaving Station 
Frankfort Lifesaving Station 
Grand Haven Lifesaving Station 
Holland Lifesaving Station 
Grand Marais Light 
Grindstone City Lifesaving Station 
Hammond Bay Lifeboat Station 
Harbor Beach Light 
Ludington Lifesaving Station
Mackinac Island Lifesaving Station 
Marquette Lifesaving Station
Middle Island Lifesaving Station 
Muskegon Lifesaving Station 
Pentwater Lifesaving Station 
Pointe aux Barques Light 
Point Betsie Light 
Port Lake Ship Canal Lifesaving Station 
North Manitou Island Lifesaving Station 
Saint Joseph Lifesaving Station 
Sleeping Bear Point Life Saving Station 
South Haven Lifesaving Station 
South Manitou Island 
Station Lake View Beach 
Sturgeon Point Light 
Tawas Point Light 
Thunder Bay Island Lifesaving Station 
Two Heart Lifesaving Station 
Vermilion Point

External links
Michigan Lighthouse Conservancy - Lifesaving Service in Michigan
U.S. Coast Guard Search & Rescue Index

Defunct agencies of the United States government
History of the United States Coast Guard

Lifesaving stations